Gandeongo-Bogodin, also spelt Gandeongo Bogdin or Gandéogo-Bogodin, is a commune in the Gounghin Department of Kouritenga Province in the Centre-Est region of Burkina Faso. It had a population of 1,219 in 2006.

Demographics

Neighbourhoods

References 

Populated places in the Centre-Est Region